This is a list of Santa Monica municipal parks. Santa Monica is an incorporated city in western Los Angeles County, California. The city operates 27 parks within city limits.

The city also operates five community gardens. The Community Garden Program began with the construction of the Main Street Community Garden in 1976, the other four are located in Euclid, Ishihara, Marine, and Park Drive parks.

The Department of Parks and Recreation operates the Santa Monica State Beach within the city limits.

References

External links 

 

Santa Monica, California

Santa Monica